Charlie Finn (born September 18, 1975) is an American film, television, and voice actor. Finn is best known for his role as the voice of Spud in American Dragon: Jake Long.

Early life and education
Finn was born in Milwaukee, Wisconsin, and raised in Lake Bluff, Illinois, where he attended Lake Forest High School. Finn majored in English at Southern Methodist University in Dallas, Texas, and was a member of the Texas Delta chapter of the Phi Delta Theta fraternity. He has been a member of the Lake Forest Players' Club since the early 1990s, and is well known for his recitals of epic Shakesperian soliloquies.
Currently lives in Boise, Idaho

Career 
Finn is known for his voice role as Spud in the animated series American Dragon: Jake Long and for co-starring in the sitcoms Life on a Stick and Help Me Help You. He has also appeared in the films Gone But Not Forgotten, Psycho Beach Party, Rolling Kansas, The Dukes of Hazzard and played a small but memorable role as a smart-ass fast-food cashier in Super Troopers. He co-starred in the film Bar Starz in 2008. He provided additional voices in Happy Feet Two. Finn also portrayed Captain 'Black Jack' Bonfield in the "Chicago" episode of Derek Waters' Drunk History on Comedy Central. He also had a small role in an episode of Sports Night.

Filmography

Film

Television

References

External links

1975 births
Living people
Male actors from Milwaukee
American male film actors
American male television actors
American male voice actors
Southern Methodist University alumni
21st-century American male actors
People from Lake Bluff, Illinois
Lake Forest High School (Illinois) alumni